Dirlewang is a market town and municipality in the district of Unterallgäu in Bavaria, Germany. The town is seat of a municipal association with Apfeltrach, Stetten, Bavaria and Unteregg.

References

Unterallgäu